"Tell Me the Old, Old Story" is a hymn.  The words were written as a poem by Katherine Hankey, an English evangelist, in 1866, while she was recovering from a serious illness in London.  It was set to music by William Hovard Doane, who was much impressed by the poem when it was recited by Major General David Russell while they were attending an international convention of the YMCA in Montreal in 1867.

Lyrics

References

English Christian hymns
1866 songs
19th-century hymns